The National Tribal Dance Festival is an annual festival celebrated by the aborigines and tribal of India in the National Capital Region, of India i.e. New Delhi. This Tribal Dance Festival annually during the month of December. It is organised by Ministry of Tribal Affairs, Government of India in collaboration with IGRMS, Bhopal, Madhya Pradesh.

The festival
The festival is used to mark the dances of Adivasi and tribal people in India and their indigenous tribal dance culture.

See also
National Tribal Festival

References

Annual events in India
Dance festivals in India
Tourist attractions in Delhi
Ministry of Tribal Affairs